Georgium is a genus of caddisflies in the  family Calamoceratidae. There are at least two described species in Georgium.

Species
These two species belong to the genus Georgium:
 Georgium japonicum (Ulmer, 1905)
 † Rhabdoceras fusculum (Ulmer, 1912)

References

Further reading

 
 
 

Integripalpia
Trichoptera genera